The Bergamo–Albino light rail is a  light rail line that connects the city of Bergamo, Italy, with the town of Albino, in the lower part of the Val Seriana. It was built on the right-of-way of the former Valle Seriana railway, closed in 1967. It opened for service on 24 April 2009.

Sources

External links 

 

Transport in Bergamo
Railway lines in Lombardy
Light rail in Italy
Railway lines opened in 2009
2009 establishments in Italy
Albino, Lombardy